Hiney is a surname. Notable people with the surname include:

Don Hiney, Canadian football player
Stephen Hiney (born 1983), Irish hurler

See also
Hindy
Winey

Surnames of Irish origin